Ella Howard Estill (1860-1941) was an American painter.

Biography 
Ella Howard Estill was born Ella Robinson Howard in 1860 in Columbus, Ohio. She married window manufacturer John Wilmot Estill in October 1887, and they had three children: Howard Wilmot, Mary Howard, and Edward Howard. After the birth of Edward, Ella became ill with tuberculosis and moved to Oracle, Arizona for her health. She began painting wildflowers and cacti in the desert. The rest of the family joined her a year later, and John opened a general store. In 1906, the family moved to Tucson. In 1921, Ella and John Estill moved to Los Angeles, where Ella died in 1941.

Her daughter, Mary Howard Cadwell, was one of the first women in the United States to earn a Ph.D. in microbiology, and later became a professor at the University of Arizona.

Painting 
Some of Estill's watercolor paintings of cacti were included in the book The Fantastic Clan, The Cactus Family by John James Thornber and Frances Bonker. The University of Arizona Herbarium contains almost 600 of Estill's watercolors in its collection.

Gallery

References

External links 

 Biography on Estill from The Sonoran Desert Florilegium Program
The Fantastic Clan, The Cactus Family at Project Gutenberg

1860 births
1941 deaths
Botanical illustrators
Artists from Columbus, Ohio
American women painters